Ethel Marian Scott,  (born July 1956) is a Scottish statistician, author and academic, specialising in environmental statistics and statistical modelling. She is Professor of Environmental Statistics at the University of Glasgow. She is additionally Vice-President (International) of the Royal Society of Edinburgh, and a member of the Scottish Science Advisory Council.

Biography 
Scott has a degree in statistics and a PhD from the University of Glasgow. Her thesis was on the sources of error in radiocarbon dating, and was supervised by Murdoch Baxter and Tom Aitchison.

Her research interests include model uncertainty and sensitivity analysis, modelling how pollutants disperse in the environment, radiocarbon dating and assessing animal welfare.  

In 2005, Scott was elected a Fellow of the Royal Society of Edinburgh (FRSE), Scotland's national academy of science and letters. In the 2009 Queen's Birthday Honours, she was appointed an Officer of the Order of the British Empire (OBE) for services to social science.

Professor Scott was awarded the Royal Statistical Society Barnett Award in 2019  for "her outstanding, pioneering research into the application of innovative statistical techniques to environmental issues."

Selected works

References

Living people
Scottish statisticians
Environmental statisticians
Women statisticians
Academics of the University of Glasgow
Officers of the Order of the British Empire
Fellows of the Royal Society of Edinburgh
Fellows of the Royal Statistical Society
1956 births
Scottish women scientists
20th-century Scottish mathematicians
21st-century Scottish mathematicians
British women mathematicians
20th-century women mathematicians
21st-century women mathematicians
Scottish women academics
20th-century Scottish women